Windsor is an incorporated town in Isle of Wight County in the Hampton Roads region of southeastern Virginia in the United States. It is located near the crossroads of U.S. Route 460 and U.S. Route 258. The population was 2,626 at the 2010 census, up from 916 at the 2000 census.

History
Windsor was established next to the Norfolk Southern Corporation's railroad. The town of Windsor was chartered on March 15, 1902. Windsor established a volunteer fire department in 1947 and its police department in 1990. In 2001, the town annexed  of Isle of Wight County, which nearly tripled its population.

The Henry Saunders House and William Scott Farmstead are listed on the National Register of Historic Places.

In 2021, it was reported that Windsor had developed a reputation for ticketing and fining passing motorists. Nearly 10 percent of the town's local revenue comes from traffic fines. The town obtained national media coverage when Windsor police stopped and pepper-sprayed Lt. Caron Nazario, a black man driving through Windsor. As a result of the Nazario incident, the Attorney General of Virginia filed suit against Windsor for its "pattern of unconstitutional and discriminatory policing" in December, 2021.

Geography
Windsor is located in southern Isle of Wight County at  (36.811175, −76.743658). U.S. Route 460 passes through the center of town, leading southeast  to Suffolk and northwest  to Petersburg. U.S. Route 258 crosses US-460 on the western side of Windsor, leading north  to Smithfield and southwest the same distance to Franklin.

Demographics

As of the census of 2000, there were 916 people, 389 households, and 269 families residing in the town. The population density was 1,077.2 people per square mile (416.1/km2). There were 422 housing units at an average density of 496.3 per square mile (191.7/km2). The racial makeup of the town was 89.74% White, 9.06% African American, 0.44% Native American, and 0.76% from two or more races. Hispanic or Latino of any race were 0.98% of the population.

There were 389 households, out of which 30.6% had children under the age of 18 living with them, 52.4% were married couples living together, 12.6% had a female householder with no husband present, and 30.6% were non-families. 27.5% of all households were made up of individuals, and 11.3% had someone living alone who was 65 years of age or older. The average household size was 2.35 and the average family size was 2.87.

In the town, the population was spread out, with 23.8% under the age of 18, 7.4% from 18 to 24, 29.0% from 25 to 44, 27.3% from 45 to 64, and 12.4% who were 65 years of age or older. The median age was 38 years. For every 100 females, there were 88.5 males. For every 100 females age 18 and over, there were 84.7 males.

The median income for a household in the town was $36,528, and the median income for a family was $44,167. Males had a median income of $34,205 versus $25,000 for females. The per capita income for the town was $20,999. About 5.9% of families and 8.8% of the population were below the poverty line, including 13.4% of those under age 18 and 8.2% of those age 65 or over.

Education
Windsor Elementary School serves students in grades of Pre-K through 5. The school mascot is the hornet, and for the 2010 – 2011 school year had a total enrollment of 613 students.

Georgie D. Tyler Middle School serves students in grades 6 through 8 and the Titan is the school mascot. The school colors are blue and silver. The school  used to be called Windsor Middle School. During Windsor Middle School's 2010 – 2011 school year yielded a total enrollment of 328 students. Georgie D Tyler Middle School opened in late summer of 2014.

Windsor High School serves students in grades 9 through 12. The school colors are royal blue and gold and the mascot is the Dukes. There were 501 students enrolled during the 2010 – 2011 school year. The school supports teams in: baseball, basketball, cheerleading, football, marching band, golf, soccer, softball, track, tennis, wrestling and volleyball, theatre, forensics, and academic bowl.

References

External links
 Town of Windsor official website
 Isle of Wight-Smithfield-Windsor Chamber of Commerce

Towns in Isle of Wight County, Virginia
Towns in Virginia